A representation of the sun is used as a heraldic charge.  The most usual form, often called sun in splendour or in his glory, consists of a round disc with the features of a human face surrounded by twelve or sixteen rays alternating wavy and straight. The alternating straight and wavy rays are often said to represent the light and heat of the sun respectively.

It was used as a badge by Edward II of England, and was later adopted by Edward IV following the appearance of a parhelion or "sun dog" before his victory at the Battle of Mortimer's Cross in 1461.
It also had significance in alchemy, and may be a symbol of the Roman deity Sol Invictus (Unconquered Sun).

It is a common charge in the heraldry of many countries, regions and cities: e.g. the bearings of Armstrong, Canada; the Sun in Splendour appears superimposed on the Cross of St. George and behind the White Rose of York on the flag of West Riding of Yorkshire; and on the arms of Banbury Town Council, England.
It also often appears as a rising sun as in the arms of East Devon District Council, England, and as a demi sun as in the coat of Aitchison, Canada.

The Sun of May represents Inti, the Incan god of the sun, and thereby Inca culture.  It appears as a heraldic sun in the national flags of Argentina (1818) and Uruguay (1828), in the flags and shields of the Peru–Bolivian Confederation (1836–1839) and its component the Republic of South Peru, in the flag of Peru of 1822–1825, and in the current flag of the Peruvian Navy (1821).

Examples

Sun in splendour, with face

Sun in splendour, without face

Straight rays (mullet)

Wavy rays (estoile)

Without rays (roundel)

Other forms

See also

Solar symbol
Splendor Solis

References

Heraldic charges
Sun
Sol Invictus

fr:Liste des meubles héraldiques#Soleil